The 1980 Purdue Boilermakers football team was an American football team that represented Purdue University during the 1980 Big Ten Conference football season. In their fourth season under head coach Jim Young, the Boilermakers finished in a tie for second place in the Big Ten Conference, compiled a 9–3 record (7–1 against Big Ten opponents), defeated Missouri in the Liberty Bowl, were ranked No. 16 in the final AP Poll, and outscored all opponents by a combined total of 328 to 233. The team played its home games at Ross–Ade Stadium in West Lafayette, Indiana.

Quarterback Mark Herrmann gained national attention for breaking the NCAA's career record for passing yardage. He finished his collegiate career having completed 772 of 1,309 passes for 9,946 yards, 71 touchdowns, and 75 interceptions. Herrmann and teammate Dave Young, a tight end, were the only two Big Ten players to be recognized as consensus first-team players on the 1980 College Football All-America Team. Herrmann also won the Chicago Tribune Silver Football as the most valuable player in the Big Ten Conference.

Several Purdue players ranked among the Big Ten leaders in various statistical categories, including the following:
 Mark Herrmann led the Big Ten Conference with 3,212 passing yards, a 65.8 pass completion percentage, 23 passing touchdowns, 8.7 yards per passing attempt, a 150.5 pass efficiency rating, and 3,026 passing yards.
 Dave Young led the Big Ten with 70 receptions and ranked second in the Big Ten with nine receiving touchdowns and third with 959 receiving yards.
 Rick Anderson led the Big Ten with 16 field goals made and a 69.6 field goal percentage and ranked second with 86 points scored.
 Jimmy Smith ranked sixth in the Big Ten with 269 kickoff return yards, seventh with seven rushing touchdowns, eighth with 54 points scored, ninth with 19.2 yards per kickoff return, and 10th with 657 rushing yards, 139 rushing attempts, and 160 plays from scrimmage.
 Bart Burrell ranked second in the Big Ten with 66 receptions and 1,001 receiving yards
 Steve Bryant ranked fifth in the Big Ten with 50 receptions, fourth in the Big Ten with 892 receiving yards, and third in the Big Ten with 17.8 yards per reception.
 Robert Williams tied for the Big Ten lead with five interceptions.
 Bill Kay led the Big Ten with 104 interception return yards.
 Scott Craig ranked fifth in the Big Ten with 122 punt return yards and seventh with 4.5 yards per punt return.

Schedule

Roster

Season summary

at Notre Dame

In non-conference play, Purdue (AP No. 9) opened its season with a 31–10 loss to Notre Dame (AP No. 11) at Notre Dame Stadium. Purdue quarterback Mark Herrmann was sidelined with a bruised thumb (injured in practice during the week) and did not play. Phil Carter rushed for 142 yards for Notre Dame. After the game, the Boilermakers fell from No. 9 to No. 11 in the AP Poll.

Wisconsin

Source: Palm Beach Post
    
    
    
    
    
    

Purdue (AP No. 20) defeated Wisconsin, 12–6. Mark Herrmann passed for 347 yards (27-43), including 200 yards to wide receiver Bart Burrell, but the Boilermakers were unable to score a touchdown, settling for three field goals. After the game, Purdue dropped out of the top 25.

UCLA
Purdue lost to UCLA, 23–14, in West Lafayette. Mark Herrmann passed for 282 yards, and his two touchdown passes gave him the Big Ten career record with 50 touchdown passes. Herrmannalso threw two interceptions in the defeat. The loss broke a 12-game winning streak for Purdue at Ross–Ade Stadium.

Miami (OH)
Purdue defeated Miami (OH), 28–3, as Mark Herrmann passed for 291 yards and three touchdowns.

Minnesota

Purdue defeated Minnesota, 21–7, in West Lafayette. In the first half, Purdue took a 21-0 lead, as Mark Herrmann completed 14 of 19 passes for 163 yards and two touchdowns. Purdue was shut out in the second half, and Herrmann had only 28 passing yards in the second half, but Purdue's 21 points in the first half were enough for the victory.

Illinois
Purdue defeated Illinois, 45–20, before a crowd of 62,121 at Memorial Stadium in Champaign. In a remarkable passing exhibition, the Big Ten single-game record for passing yardage was broken twice in the same game. Mark Herrmann broke the record first with 371 yards on 24-of-35 passing, surpassing the mark set two years earlier by Eddie Smith. Bart Burrell caught 10 passes for 186 yards. Herrmannwent to the bench halfway through the fourth quarter, only to watch his record broken by Illinois quarterback Dave Wilson who tallied 425 passing yards as the Illini passed with abandon through the final minutes.  Wilson also broke Big Ten single-game records with 58 passes and 35 completions.

Michigan State
Purdue defeated Michigan State, 36–25, in West Lafayette. Mark Herrmann completed 24 of 46 passes for 340 yards to break the NCAA career record for passing yardage. Herrmann passed the prior record of 7,747 yards set by Jack Thompson from 1976 to 1978. Dave Young caught 12 passes for 172 yards. Michigan State quarterback John Leister threw more passes (54) than Herrmann, but completed only 18, had five interceptions, and lost a fumble. After the game, Michigan State coach Muddy Waters said, "John is pretty disgusted with himself."

Northwestern
Purdue (AP No. 20) defeated Northwestern, 52–31, before a crowd of 17,744 persons at Dyche Stadium in Evanston. Purdue's 52 points was its highest scoring output in a game since 1947. Purdue running back rushed for 190 yards and scored four touchdown. Mark Herrmann passed for 210 yards and three touchdowns. Herrmann also set the all-time record for career pass completions (651) and interceptions (69).

 Jimmy Smith 29 rushes, 190 yards

Iowa

    
    
    
    
    
    
    
    
    
    
    
    

Purdue (AP No. 17) defeated Iowa, 58–13, at Ross–Ade Stadium in West Lafayette. Mark Herrmann set a Purdue single-game record with 439 passing yards on 26 of 34 passing. Herrmannalso set an NCAA career record with 1,151 pass completions.

Michigan
Michigan defeated Purdue, 26–0, for Michigan's third consecutive shut out. The victory was particularly impressive as the Wolverines held Purdue's record-setting quarterback, Mark Herrmann, to 129 passing yard (24 in the second half), intercepted four of Herrmann's passes, and did not allow a first down by Purdue in the second half. Coach Schembechler credited Michigan defensive coordinator Bill McCartney with the strategy of playing six defensive backs that held Purdue's offense scoreless.

Indiana

In the annual battle for the Old Oaken Bucket, Purdue defeated Indiana, 24–23, in West Lafayette. Purdue led, 24–17, with 21 seconds left when Tim Clifford threw a touchdown pass to Steve Corso (Indiana coach Lee Corso's son). Rather than kick an extra point to tie the game, Indiana coach Corso called for a pass play to win the game; the pass was knocked down by linebacker Mike Marks, and Purdue preserved a one-point lead. The Hoosiers regained possession on the onside kick but Don Geisler missed a 59-yard field goal as time expired.  In his final home game, Mark Herrmann finished 19 of 23 for 323 yards and a touchdown.

Liberty Bowl
At the Liberty Bowl in Memphis, Purdue defeated Missouri, 28-25.  Mark Herrmann completed his Purdue career with his third MVP award in a bowl game, and the Boilermakers' third consecutive bowl game victory.

Awards
Consensus All-Americans: QB Mark Herrmann (unanimous – AFCA, Football News, AP, FWAA, UPI, Walter Camp), TE Dave Young (unanimous – AFCA, AP, FWAA, Sporting News, UPI)
All-Big Ten: QB Mark Herrmann (1st), DB Bill Kay (1st), LB James Looney (1st), TE Dave Young (1st), K Rick Anderson (2nd), WR Bart Burrell (2nd), LB Tom Kingsbury (2nd), LB Mike Marks (2nd), SS Tim Seneff (2nd)
Chicago Tribune MVP: QB Mark Herrmann
Big Ten MVP: QB Mark Herrmann

References

Purdue
Purdue Boilermakers football seasons
Liberty Bowl champion seasons
Purdue Boilermakers football